The 1944 Bowling Green Falcons football team, sometimes referred to as the Bee Gees, was an American football team that represented Bowling Green State College (later renamed Bowling Green State University)  as an independent during the 1944 college football season. In their fourth season under head coach Robert Whittaker, the Falcons compiled a 5–3 record and outscored opponents by a total of 133 to 117. Donald Mohr was the team captain. The team played its home games at University Stadium in Bowling Green, Ohio.

Schedule

References

Bowling Green
Bowling Green Falcons football seasons
Bowling Green Falcons football